Derek Elphinstone (1913–1999) was a British actor.

Derek Elphinstone was born on 15 October 1913 in Surrey. He was the son of Montague Elphinstone was also an actor and from a family of actors. Montague Elphinstone served in the Boer War and the First World War, rising to the rank of Major. In 1912, Montague Elphinstone married Norah Hume, but he died in a flying accident in 1917.

Derek Elphinstone died in February 1999 in East Sussex.

Filmography
The Four Feathers (1939) as Lieutenant Parker
Sailors Three (1940) as British Observer
In Which We Serve (1942) as No 1
Distant Trumpet (1952) as Richard Anthony
Secret People (1952) as Plain Clothes Man

Television
The Witness for the Prosecution (1949), as Sir Wilfrid Robarts in a BBC adaptation of Agatha Christie's play

References

1913 births
1999 deaths
British actors
Male actors from Surrey
English male film actors
English male television actors
20th-century British actors